Melosaurinae is an extinct subfamily of temnospondyl amphibians, part of the family Archegosauridae. Most melosaurines are known from Russia, although an unnamed species has been found in Brazil. Unlike the long-skulled archegosaurids of the family Platyoposaurinae, melosaurines have shorter, broadened snouts.

Phylogeny
Below is a cladogram modified from Ruta et al. (2007):

References

Stereospondylomorphs
Permian temnospondyls